The Agaricomycetes are a class of fungi in the division Basidiomycota. The taxon is roughly identical to that defined for the Homobasidiomycetes  (alternatively called holobasidiomycetes) by Hibbett & Thorn, with the inclusion of Auriculariales and Sebacinales. It includes not only mushroom-forming fungi, but also most species placed in the deprecated taxa Gasteromycetes and Homobasidiomycetes.  Within the subdivision Agaricomycotina, which already excludes the smut and rust fungi, the Agaricomycetes can be further defined by the exclusion of the classes Tremellomycetes and Dacrymycetes, which are generally considered to be jelly fungi. However, a few former "jelly fungi", such as Auricularia, are classified in the Agaricomycetes.  According to a 2008 estimate, Agaricomycetes include 17 orders, 100 families, 1147 genera, and about 21000 species. Modern molecular phylogenetic analyses have been since used to help define several new orders in the Agaricomycetes: Amylocorticiales, Jaapiales, Stereopsidales, and Lepidostromatales.

Classification

Although morphology of the mushroom or fruit body (basidiocarp) was the basis of early classification of the Agaricomycetes, this is no longer the case.  As an example, the distinction between the Gasteromycetes (including puffballs) and Agaricomycetes (most other agaric mushrooms) is no longer recognized as a natural one—various puffball species have apparently evolved independently from agaricomycete fungi. However, most mushroom guide books still group the puffballs or gasteroid forms separate from other mushrooms because the older Friesian classification is still convenient for categorizing fruit body forms.  Similarly, modern classifications divide the gasteroid order Lycoperdales between Agaricales and Phallales.

Features

Ecology
Nearly all species are terrestrial (a few are aquatic), occurring in a wide range of environments where most function as decayers, especially of wood. However, some species are pathogenic or parasitic, and yet others are symbiotic (i.e., mutualistic), these including the important ectomycorrhizal symbionts of forest trees. General discussions on the forms and life cycles of these fungi are developed in the article on mushrooms, in the treatments of the various orders (links in table at right), and in individual species accounts.

Evolution

A study of 5,284 species with a backbone phylogeny based on 104 genomes has suggested the following dates of evolution:

Agaricomycetidae ~ (–)
Cantharellales   (–)
Agaricales   (-)
Hymenochaetales  (–)
Boletales  (–)

Fossil record
The fruit bodies of Agaricomycetes are extremely rare in the fossil record, and the class does not yet pre-date the Early Cretaceous (146–100 Ma). The oldest Agaricomycetes fossil, dating from the lower Cretaceous (130–125 Ma) is Quatsinoporites. It is a fragment of a poroid fruit body with features that suggest it could be a member of the family Hymenochaetaceae. Based on molecular clock analysis, the Agaricomycetes are estimated to be about 290 million years old.

Phylogeny

Modern molecular phylogenetics suggest the following relationships:

Genera incertae sedis
There are many genera in the Agaricomycetes that have not been classified in any order or family. These include:

Akenomyces
Aldridgea
Anixia
Arrasia
Arthrodochium
Arualis
Atraporiella
Cenangiomyces
Ceraceopsis
Corticomyces
Cruciger
Dendrosporomyces
Ellula
Fibulochlamys
Fibulocoela
Fibulotaeniella
Geotrichopsis
Gloeoradulum
Gloeosynnema
Glomerulomyces
Glutinoagger
Grandinia
Granulocystis
Hallenbergia
Hyphobasidiofera
Hypolyssus
Intextomyces
Korupella
Minostroscyta
Mylittopsis
Odonticium
Pagidospora
Peniophorella
Phlyctibasidium
Pseudasterodon
Purpureocorticium S.H.Wu (2017)
Pycnovellomyces
Resinicium
Riessia
Riessiella
Skvortzovia
Taiwanoporia
Timgrovea
Titaeella
Trechinothus
Tricladiomyces
Trimitiella
Tubulicrinopsis
Xanthoporus
Xenosoma

References

External links

 
 Tree of Life Agaricomycetes by David S. Hibbett
 Overview of the Basidiomycota from Aarhus University, Denmark
 Evolution & Morphology in the Homobasidiomycetes

 
Basidiomycota classes
Lichen classes
Taxa described in 2001